Failbetter Games is a British video game developer and interactive fiction studio based in London.

History 

Founded in 2009 by Alexis Kennedy and Paul Arendt, Failbetter is chiefly known for its Fallen London Victorian Gothic franchise (comprising, to date, the Fallen London and Silver Tree browser games and the Sunless Sea and Sunless Skies video games), which has garnered a cult following.  Failbetter was also commissioned by BioWare to build a browser-game prologue for Dragon Age: Inquisition, and by UK publisher Harvill Secker to create a puzzle game to accompany The Night Circus. The studio has consistently won acclaim for the quality of its writing, world-building and storytelling.

In 2016, Alexis Kennedy left Failbetter, citing a desire to work with a variety of other studios and work on his own smaller, more experimental projects.

In February 2017, Failbetter ran a successful Kickstarter for a sequel to Sunless Sea, Sunless Skies, raising almost half a million dollars. However, December that same year Failbetter unexpectedly laid off four members of staff, citing the under-performance of the Sunless Sea iPad port, and poor sales of their Sunless Skies in early access. Failbetter was subsequently the target of an extensive but inconclusive investigative report by Eurogamer, which cited Kennedy and other unnamed staff in claiming poor management and a 'toxic' culture had developed since Kennedy's departure.

Failbetter are currently developing a new romantic visual novel set in the Fallen London universe called Mask of the Rose, which will serve as a prequel to the other games in the franchise.

Litigation 
In July 2021, founder Alexis Kennedy asserted that due to legal errors made at his departure, he had unexpectedly remained the majority owner of the business, and that he was attempting to negotiate with Failbetter to resolve the matter. Failbetter did not respond publicly, but in July 2022 filed a lawsuit against Kennedy to require him to sell his shares. As part of the lawsuit, Failbetter obtained an injunction to block Kennedy from using his rights as a majority shareholder while the case was resolved. 

In November 2022 at a preliminary High Court hearing, Kennedy's lawyers argued that he had entered an agreement to sell his shares only "on a certain understanding as to how the company would subsequently behave and how the staff would be treated", and that this understanding had been "mistaken". They cited in evidence the staff redundancies described in the Eurogamer report, as well as "an online hate campaign against Mr Kennedy", including "baseless allegations of sexual harassment and grooming" and "speculating as to the extent to which the participants might be willing to defecate on Mr Kennedy's corpse". Failbetter argued that this evidence was not relevant to the case, and should be struck out. The High Court found that the evidence was capable of argument, and denied the strikeout application.

The trial was originally scheduled for March 2023, but in February 2023 Failbetter and Kennedy mutually agreed an adjournment.

Games developed

References

External links

Companies based in the London Borough of Southwark
Video game companies established in 2010
Video game companies of the United Kingdom
Video game development companies